Chervonenko is a Ukrainian surname. The Belarusian form is Charvonenka. Notable people with this surname include:

Stepan Chervonenko, Russian diplomat
Yevhen Chervonenko, Ukrainian politician and racing driver

See also
 
Chervonenkis 

Ukrainian-language surnames